The Fogg Library is a historic library building at 1 Columbian Street in Weymouth, Massachusetts.  Built in 1897 to a design by Cutting, Carleton & Cutting, the Renaissance Revival stone building serves as a branch of the Weymouth Public Library.  It was a gift of local businessman John S. Fogg.  It has a steeply pitched gable roof with stepped ends in the Dutch Revival style, and a projecting gable section which houses the entry under a round-arched loggia.

The building was listed on the National Register of Historic Places in 1981.

See also
National Register of Historic Places listings in Norfolk County, Massachusetts

References

Library buildings completed in 1897
Libraries on the National Register of Historic Places in Massachusetts
Libraries in Norfolk County, Massachusetts
Weymouth, Massachusetts
National Register of Historic Places in Norfolk County, Massachusetts